Jenifer Bamuturaki is a Ugandan businesswoman and corporates executive, who serves as the chief executive officer of Uganda Airlines, the national airline of Uganda, since July 2022. Before that she served as the CEO in acting capacity, at the same airline.

Background and education
Bamuturaki is Ugandan by birth. After completion of her primary and secondary education, she was admitted to Makerere University, Uganda's largest public university, where she graduated with a Bachelor of Arts degree in Social Work and Social Administration. She also has qualifications in airlines sales from the International Air Transport Association (IATA), and qualifications in hotel sales and revenue management. As of August 2022, she was pursuing studies leading to a Master of Public Administration degree, from Makerere University.

Career
As of February 2019, Bamuturaki's career stretched back nearly 30 years. She started out as a guest relations officer at the Kampala Sheraton Hotel. Most of her career has been in marketing, in the hospitality and travel industries. When the defunct Air Uganda was formed in 2007, Bamuturaki joined and served in the sales and later in the marketing departments.

In 2019, when the government of Uganda revived Uganda Airlines, Bamuturaki was hired as the commercial manager of the new airline. However, after the probationary period ended, she was not given a long-term contract. She left the airline to pursue other business interests .

Following the suspension and interdiction of the entire board of directors and many senior management executives at the airline in April 2021, the shareholders recalled Bamuturaki and made her the acting CEO.

Other considerations
With her appointment as CEO, she becomes the first substantive CEO at the airline and the first woman to serve in that position. Ephraim Bagenda and Cornwell Muleya served as acting CEOs before Bamuturaki was named to head the country's national airline.

In an interview with the New Vision, soon after her appointment as substantive CEO, she outlined three areas, where the airline is focusing in the short and medium terms. The first task is to establish self ground-handling at Entebbe International Airport, no later than August 2022. The second task is to increase the destinations for the airline's A330-800 fleet. Destinations under consideration include, Kinshasa, Lagos, Accra, Mumbai and Khartoum. The third task is to attempt to reduce operational costs.

Awards and recognition
On 31 October 2022, Bamuturaki was awarded The 2022 Africa Travel and Tourism 100 Award, at a ceremony in Lagos, Nigeria. The award recognizes outstanding women in the African travel and tourism sector. She beat 99 other women nominees to win the award.

See also
 Transport in Uganda
 List of airlines of Uganda

References

External links
  Website of Uganda Airlines
 Uganda: Museveni Appoints New Uganda Airlines CEO As of 6 July 2022.

Living people
Year of birth missing (living people)
21st-century Ugandan businesswomen
21st-century Ugandan businesspeople
Ugandan women chief executives
Makerere University alumni